The following is a list of episodes of the animated television series Around the World with Willy Fog and its sequel Willy Fog 2.

Around the World with Willy Fog

The original series was produced in 1983 by Spanish BRB Internacional and Televisión Española with animation by Japanese studio Nippon Animation, based on Around the World in Eighty Days by Jules Verne, featuring various anthropomorphic animals with the main protagonists as felines (except Tico) and the main antagonists as canines. A narrator introduced each episode at the beginning of each episode and summarized the upcoming episodes at the end of each episode, a similar format of BRB’s Dogtanian and the Three Muskehounds. The opening song was Around the World with Willy Fog and the closing credits song was Sílbame (aka Rigodon) by Mocedades.

Episode list

Willy Fog 2

The second series was produced in 1993 by BRB Internacional and Televisión Española with animation by Wang Film Productions and was again based on the work of Jules Verne, this time split between Journey to the Centre of the Earth and 20,000 Leagues Under the Sea. Again, aside from the introduction of additional characters—significantly more so than in the adaptation of Around the World in 80 Days since neither Fog nor any of his friends are in Verne's books—the series followed the novel quite faithfully. It was narrated by Rigodon, who summarized both the previous and upcoming episodes at the start and end of each new edition. The opening theme song re-used the music from Around the World with Willy Fog with new words detailing the cast's journey's to the 'Centre of the Earth' and the 'Bottom of the Sea', while the closing credits used a different song to the first series, "Romy". It was first broadcast on La 2.

Willy Fog in Journey to the Centre of the Earth

Willy Fog in 20,000 Leagues Under the Sea

References

External links
Episode Lists at BRBPlay for Around the World with Willy Fog and Willy Fog 2 at BRBPlay (BRB Internacional)
Promotional Flyer for Willy Fog 2

Around the World with Willy Fog
Around the World with Willy Fog